Winslow is an unincorporated community and former coal town on KY 1134 in Boyd County, Kentucky, United States. Its post office is closed.

References

Unincorporated communities in Boyd County, Kentucky
Unincorporated communities in Kentucky
Coal towns in Kentucky